Rough and Ready Island Naval Supply Depot  or Ruff and Ready Island is a former United States Navy installation on the San Joaquin River in Stockton, California in San Joaquin County, near the Stockton Channel and was  west of Stockton. The Supply Depot was built during World War II as part of the San Joaquin Depot that operated the nearby Tracy Depot Facility and the Sharpe Depot Facility. It was named in honor of President Zachary Taylor.

Development 

After  World War II began, a new type of naval supply station, the great inland supply depot situated far enough inland to be safe from naval bombardment, was developed. In the spring of 1944, the ability to service the European theater of operations became somewhat stabilized. Increasing emphasis was placed on supplies for the Pacific Theatre of War. West Coast loading facilities at the Naval Supply Depots in San Pedro, Oakland, and Seattle, Washington were already heavily congested which necessitated finding additional facilities for storing and loading supplies.

The planned logistic load included in the plans for the prosecution of the Pacific war would far exceed Oakland's capacity. Transportation and shore-side congestion at the other ports made it necessary to find facilities for loading elsewhere than in the ports themselves. The decision was made to construct a supply annex to NSD Oakland outside the San Francisco Bay area at Stockton. The total work-load of the Oakland and Stockton locations was to include 80 percent of the required fleet supply for the West Coast.

The new depot was the first supply depot to be built entirely according to standard designs developed during the war to meet all requirements of modern materials handling. It was built on Rough and Ready Island, an almost ideal site. It was adjacent to a city with excellent rail and highway connections.

Construction authorization 

The Commandant of the 12th Naval District endorsed the recommendation for use of Stockton, and added suggested that sufficient property be acquired to provide not only for the supply depot, but also for a freight-car classification yard, in-transit reclassification storage, a material redistribution center, and voyage repair facilities. The Chief of the Bureau of Supplies and Accounts, in forwarding the request, requested that the number of storehouses be increased from 20 to 36 to accommodate aviation supply storage urgently needed on the West Coast. Preliminary site survey and soil investigation was authorized June 9, 1944. The  island was flat, and foundation experience on nearby structures indicated new buildings could be erected without pile support. Moreover, the presence of sandy soil assured easy earth moving. Thee highway bridges connected the island with the main land, and the Port of Stockton belt-line railroad, which served the site, connected with three large railroads, the Southern Pacific, the Western Pacific, and the Santa Fe.

On July 26, 1944, the Secretary of the Navy approved the ultimate development of the island in four increments, to a total expenditure of $28,490,000. Construction of 28 storehouses, 22 of steel frame and 6 of wood frame, began October 21, 1944. By June 30, 1945, the authorized number of storehouses was 38.

Standardization employed 

At Rough and Ready Island Annex, all storehouses were built according to designs standardized for the most economical use of space needs presented by the palletization and fork-lift truck programs of the Bureau of Supplies and Accounts. The pallet was standardized by the Bureau of Supplies and Accounts to consist of wooden, double-bottomed platforms, four feet square. Each pallets was loaded with packaged material to a height of approximately four feet, formed a cube, which, secured by wire, could be easily and quickly moved by a fork-lift truck and cargo from depot to ship to fighting lines without disassembling. The standard pallets were exchanged between installations, those sent overseas being chalked off as expendable. Buildings to meet this need had been constructed at the other depots, but the growth of the depots had been contemporaneous with the growth of the standardization, so that no other depot met the requirements in every building.

These standardized warehouses were first used at Mechanicsburg, Pennsylvania and then at Clearfield, Utah, but it was at Stockton that they were first used throughout the station.

Original plans called for nine transit sheds and a  marginal wharf, but unfavorable soil conditions encountered during construction made the reduction necessary. Two structures, originally intended as transit sheds, were erected as storehouses on locations near the center of the island.

Thirty standard-size steel-frame general storehouses, six wood-frame general storehouses, and two steel-frame heavy materials storehouses completed the wartime development of major buildings at Stockton.

The site offered  of water frontage available. It also allowed sufficient space to provide for the needs of the sub-depot, and berthing space for a minimum of five ships requiring voyage repairs.

Operation 

The Rough and Ready Island Annex opened in 1944 and operated as a supply Depot until 1959 when it became the Naval Communications Station for the Pacific Coast region. The Depot Annex served the United States Pacific Fleet. The Depot warehoused naval stores, disposed of surplus Naval property and provided logistical support for other Naval bases. For some time the wharf was used to store as mothballed ships of the reserve fleet for the Pacific Reserve Fleet.

Decommissioning 

The Naval Supply Depot was phased out of use as a result of special legislation sponsored by Senator Dianne Feinstein in 1995. It was transferred to the Port of Stockton between 2000 and 2003. This area of the port is now known as the "West Complex".

Rough and Ready Island Naval Supply Depot was also known as: Rough and Ready Island; Naval Supply Center, Oakland; Stockton Annex; Stockton Deep Water Slip Channel and Kwajalein Village, California.

Camp Stockton 

Camp Stockton, a Prisoners of War (POW) camp, was built on the island during the Second World War. The camp opened in April 1944 and closed in June 1946, and held 1551 German POWs. Five German POWs died at the camp and are buried at Benicia Army Cemetery. 

"Camp Stockton" is also sometimes used to refer to the Stockton Assembly Center for the temporary detention of Japanese Americans, located at the San Joaquin County Fairgrounds. When the Japanese Americans were moved to permanent camps, the facility became a POW camp. The Stockton detention facility held 889 prisoners.

Pacific Reserve Fleet, Stockton

Pacific Reserve Fleet, Stockton also called Pacific Reserve Fleet, Stockton Group  was a United States Navy reserve fleets in the San Joaquin River at Stockton, California. The mothball fleet of World War II ships was next to the Naval Reserve Center on Rough and Ready Island. The freshwater of the river made a good spot to store ships. Some ships there were reactivated for Korean War and Vietnam War.

See also 

 San Joaquin Depot
 Tracy Facility
 Sharpe Facility
 American Theater (1939–1945)
 Desert Training Center
 Military history of the United States during World War II
 United States home front during World War II

References 

This article contains content written by the United States military in the public domain.

Closed installations of the United States Navy
Stockton, California